Nososticta baroalba is a species of Australian damselfly in the family Platycnemididae,
commonly known as a black-winged threadtail. 
It has only been found in the Northern Territory, where it inhabits streams.

Nososticta baroalba is a small, slender damselfly, that is coloured black with brown markings, and has dark wings.

Etymology
The species name baroalba is from Baroalba Creek, Northern Territory, Australia, where the holotype was found.

Gallery

See also
 List of Odonata species of Australia

References 

Platycnemididae
Odonata of Australia
Insects of Australia
Endemic fauna of Australia
Taxa named by J.A.L. (Tony) Watson
Taxa named by Günther Theischinger
Insects described in 1984
Damselflies